Pericyma basalis is a moth of the family Noctuidae. It is found on Madagascar and Réunion.

The wingspan of this species is 30 mm.

References

External links
 Lépidoptères de La Réunion - picture of Ozopteryx basalis

Acontiinae
Moths of Madagascar
Moths of Réunion
Moths described in 1891